Damián Bariš (born 9 December 1994) is a Slovak football midfielder who currently plays for FK Železiarne Podbrezová.

Club career

AS Trenčín
Bariš made his debut for FK AS Trenčín against ŠK Slovan Bratislava on 28 April 2013, entering in as a substitute in place of Aldo Baéz.

References

External links
 AS Trenčín profile 
 Corgoň Liga profile 
 

1994 births
Living people
Slovak footballers
Association football midfielders
AS Trenčín players
FC Zbrojovka Brno players
AFC Nové Mesto nad Váhom players
MFK Skalica players
FC ViOn Zlaté Moravce players
FK Železiarne Podbrezová players
Slovak Super Liga players
Sportspeople from Trenčín
Expatriate footballers in the Czech Republic
Slovak expatriate sportspeople in the Czech Republic
Czech National Football League players